Aintzane Ezenarro Egurbide (Getaria, Spain, 1971) is a Spanish politician. She is the Aralar's spokeswoman in the Basque Parliament since 2005 Basque parliamentary election. She is also councillor of her hometown, Getaria.

Aintzane Ezenarro studied sociology and journalism and she took part in Elkarri, the social movement for the dialogue and peace in the Basque Country.

In the recent basque election's Aralar increased both its votes and seats, passing from 28,000 votes to 62,000 and from one only seat (occupied by Ezenarro herself) to four seats. With those results, Ezenarro became leader of the Aralar parliamentary group.

External links
  Aintzane Ezenarro's blog

1971 births
Aralar (Basque political party) politicians
Living people
Members of the 8th Basque Parliament
Members of the 9th Basque Parliament
People from Urola Kosta
Women members of the Basque Parliament
Municipal councillors in the Basque Country (autonomous community)
University of the Basque Country alumni